Baptist Town is a historical African-American neighborhood located in Greenwood, Mississippi located east of the downtown area.

A Mississippi Blues Trail marker was erected in the neighborhood in 2009 noting its contribution to the blues.

Scenes from The Help were filmed in Baptist Town.

Notable residents
Morgan Freeman, Academy Award winning actor was raised in Baptist Town.

Robert Johnson, blues singer, songwriter and musician. Lived and performed in Baptist Town.

Honeyboy Edwards, blues guitarist and singer. Lived and performed in Baptist Town and was a close friend of Robert Johnson.

References

Greenwood, Mississippi micropolitan area
Neighborhoods in Mississippi
Unincorporated communities in Leflore County, Mississippi
Unincorporated communities in Mississippi
Mississippi Blues Trail